Yemetsk is a rural locality (a selo) and the administrative center of Yemetskoye Rural Settlement of Kholmogorsky District, Arkhangelsk Oblast, Russia. The population was 1,077 as of 2010. There are 10 streets.

Geography 
Yemetsk is located on the Yemtsy River, 104 km south of Kholmogory (the district's administrative centre) by road. Shiltsovo is the nearest rural locality.

References 

Rural localities in Kholmogorsky District
Kholmogorsky Uyezd